The Roman Catholic Diocese of Wuzhou is a diocese located in the city of Wuzhou (Guangxi) in the Roman Catholic Archdiocese of Nanning in China.

History
 June 30, 1930: Established as Mission "sui iuris" of Wuzhou 梧州 from the Apostolic Vicariate of Nanning 南寧
 December 10, 1934: Promoted as Apostolic Prefecture of Wuzhou 梧州
 July 20, 1939: Promoted as Apostolic Vicariate of Wuzhou 梧州
 April 11, 1946: Promoted as Diocese of Wuzhou 梧州

Leadership
 Ecclesiastical Superiors of Wuzhou 梧州 
 Fr. Bernard F. Meyer, M.M. (马奕猷) (October 30, 1931 – December 10, 1934)
 Prefects Apostolic of Wuzhou 梧州 (Roman Rite)
 Fr. Bernard F. Meyer, M.M. (马奕猷) (December 10, 1934 – 1939)
 Vicars Apostolic of Wuzhou 梧州 (Roman Rite)
 Bishop Frederick Anthony Donaghy, M.M. (唐汝琪) (July 20, 1939 – April 11, 1946)
 Bishops of Wuzhou 梧州 
 Bishop Frederick Anthony Donaghy, M.M. (唐汝琪) (April 11, 1946 – 1983)

References

 GCatholic.org
 Catholic Hierarchy

Roman Catholic dioceses in China
Christian organizations established in 1930
Roman Catholic dioceses and prelatures established in the 20th century
Religion in Guangxi
Wuzhou